Saint-Cyprien-sur-Dourdou (literally Saint-Cyprien on Dourdou) is a former commune in the Aveyron department in southern France. On 1 January 2016, it was merged into the new commune of Conques-en-Rouergue.

Population

See also
Communes of the Aveyron department

References

Former communes of Aveyron
Aveyron communes articles needing translation from French Wikipedia
Populated places disestablished in 2016